The seventh-generation Honda Accord for the European and Japanese markets is a mid-size car that was available as a four-door sedan or a five-door station wagon and was produced by Honda from October 2002 (for the 2003 model year) to 2008. It won the 2002-03 Japan Car of the Year upon its launch.

For this generation, the European and Japanese Accords, previously separate models, were consolidated into a single version designed to be more competitive in the European market. It became a top seller in its class in Australia, where over 45,000 sedans were sold between 2003 and 2008. The car was also exported to the United States and Canada, where it was sold as the Acura TSX. Outside North America the first Honda-built diesel engine was offered. In the Japanese market, the Accord was merged into the Torneo range to compete against the Mazda Atenza and Subaru Legacy. 

A variant of the larger North American Accord was sold in Japan as the Honda Inspire to compete in the entry-level luxury sedan class. In markets where both versions of the Accord are sold, such as in New Zealand and Australia, the smaller Japan/Europe-type car is called Accord Euro to distinguish it from the larger North American model.

Honda Accord Euro R (LA-CL7) 
A Mugen Motorsports concept was unveiled at the 2009 Pro shop Refill.

The Accord Euro R was officially sold only in Japan, but has been parallel imported to Hong Kong, Malaysia, Singapore and Pakistan.

Gallery

Marketing

References 

Accord
Euro NCAP large family cars
Sedans
Station wagons
Cars introduced in 2002
Cars discontinued in 2008
Front-wheel-drive vehicles